The Sadat Museum is a cultural museum in Alexandria, Egypt, dedicated to the legacy of Egyptian president Anwar Al Sadat. It was inaugurated on February 17, 2009, by Suzanne Mubarak and Jehan Al Sadat and is located next to the planetarium of the Bibliotheca Alexandrina, encompassing 200 square meters. The museum also launched an internet website that contains videos, images and documents about Sadat. The Museum holds the military uniform Sadat was wearing when he was assassinated, his desk, radio and some of the swords he received from Arab countries. The web collection contains 14,000 images and 61 hours of video.

Contents
The museum features a number of decorations, medals and necklaces obtained by the late President during the various stages of his life. His radio, desk and personal library are also on display, with a collection of rare books, which were given to him by various nations. Portraits of Sadat, including one by artist Etemad Al Tarablosi are displayed throughout the museum. The museum also includes his personal walking stick, Marshal stick, and a collection of Arab swords, which he received as gifts from Arab states of the Persian Gulf. The museum also contains commemorative shields, which were addressed to him in different occasions. Sadat's pipe, and cloak, which he wore during his visit to his birthplace in the village of Mit Abul Kom in northern Egypt, are also included in the vast collection of the museum. A recording of Sadat reciting the Qur'an, a short story he wrote and some video recordings, were donated by Jihan Al Sadat to the museum.

Gallery

References

External links

 Official website

Museums in Alexandria
Biographical museums in Egypt
History museums in Egypt
Anwar Sadat
Articles containing video clips
Museums established in 2009
2009 establishments in Egypt